Isopeda is a genus of huntsman spiders that was first described by Ludwig Carl Christian Koch in 1875.

Species
 it contains nineteen species and one subspecies, found in Papua New Guinea, Australia, the Philippines, and on New Caledonia:
Isopeda alpina Hirst, 1992 – Australia (New South Wales, Victoria)
Isopeda binnaburra Hirst, 1992 – Australia (Queensland)
Isopeda brachyseta Hirst, 1992 – Australia (New South Wales)
Isopeda canberrana Hirst, 1992 – Australia (New South Wales, Victoria)
Isopeda catmona Barrion & Litsinger, 1995 – Philippines
Isopeda deianira (Thorell, 1881) – New Guinea
Isopeda echuca Hirst, 1992 – Australia (New South Wales, Victoria)
Isopeda girraween Hirst, 1992 – Australia (Queensland)
Isopeda leishmanni Hogg, 1903 – Australia (Western Australia, South Australia, Victoria)
Isopeda l. hoggi Simon, 1908 – Australia (Western Australia)
Isopeda magna Hirst, 1992 – Australia (Western Australia, South Australia)
Isopeda montana Hogg, 1903 – Australia (South Australia, Victoria)
Isopeda neocaledonica Berland, 1924 – New Caledonia
Isopeda parnabyi Hirst, 1992 – Australia (Queensland, New South Wales)
Isopeda prolata Hirst, 1992 – Australia (New South Wales, Victoria)
Isopeda queenslandensis Hirst, 1992 – Australia (Queensland, New South Wales)
Isopeda subalpina Hirst, 1992 – Australia (Victoria)
Isopeda vasta (L. Koch, 1867) (type) – Australia (Queensland)
Isopeda villosa L. Koch, 1875 – Australia (New South Wales)
Isopeda woodwardi Hogg, 1903 – Australia (South Australia)

In synonymy:
I. conspersula Strand, 1913 = Isopeda vasta (L. Koch, 1867)
I. pengellya Hogg, 1903 = Isopeda leishmanni Hogg, 1903

See also
 List of Sparassidae species

References

Araneomorphae genera
Sparassidae
Spiders of Oceania
Taxa named by Carl Ludwig Koch